Tone Vigeland (born 6 August 1938) is a Norwegian goldsmith/silversmith and jewellery designer.

Personal life
Vigeland was born in Oslo to painter Per Vigeland and Randi Helleberg, and is a granddaughter of painter Emanuel Vigeland.

Career
She has studied at the Norwegian National Academy of Craft and Art Industry. She is represented in galleries worldwide, including the European Victoria and Albert Museum, Pinakothek der Moderne and Musée des Arts Décoratifs, Paris, New York City museums Museum of Modern Art and the Museum of Art and Design, Cooper Hewitt, Smithsonian Design Museum, and the Museum of Fine Arts, Houston. She was awarded the Prince Eugen Medal in 1988, and was decorated Commander of the Order of St. Olav in 1996.

References

1938 births
Living people
Artists from Oslo
Norwegian goldsmiths
Norwegian silversmiths
Norwegian jewellery designers
Oslo National Academy of the Arts alumni
Recipients of the Prince Eugen Medal
Women metalsmiths